

See also
List of mines in Australia
 List of coal mines in Australia
 Energy in Australia

References

Queensland
Coal, Queensland
Queensland